Colonel Bengt Folke Bengtsson (30 September 1897 – 10 October 1977) was a Swedish Army officer. He served in the Air Defense Artillery Branch and finished his military career as Inspector of the Air Defence from 1953 to 1957.

Early life
Bengtsson was born on 30 September 1897 at Rössjöholm Castle in Tåssjö, Kristianstad County, the son of Sven Bengtsson, an estate agent, and his wife Ella (née Ljunggren). Bengt Bengtsson was the youngest brother of Swedish author Frans G. Bengtsson. Bengtsson was commissioned as an officer in 1918 and was assigned as a second lieutenant to Wendes Artillery Regiment in Kristianstad. He attended the Royal Central Gymnastics Institute from 1921 to 1922. He competed as a gymnast in the 1920 Summer Olympics. He was part of the Swedish team, which was able to win the gold medal in the gymnastics men's team, Swedish system event in 1920.

Career
Bengtsson attended the Swedish Army Artillery and Engineering College's higher course from 1922 to 1924. He did rehearsal training from 1924 to 1926 and became a lieutenant in the Artillery Staff in 1930. In 1931, he underwent aerial reconnaissance training and was promoted to captain in 1932. The same year Bengtsson was posted to Finland. He then served in Småland Artillery Regiment in Jönköping in 1936 where he became a major in 1939. Bengtsson transferred to the Air Defense Artillery Branch (Luftvärnstrupperna) in 1939 and served in the General Staff Corps in 1940. He participated in the Winter War in 1940.

Bengtsson was promoted to lieutenant colonel in 1941 and was head of the Defence Staff's Air Defense Department from 1940 to 1943. He served as an expert in the Air Protection Inspectorate (Luftskyddsinspektionen) and the Evacuation Commission (Utrymningskommissionen) from 1940 to 1943, as an agent in the National Aerial-Protection Association (Riksluftskyddsförbundet) from 1940 to 1943 and was a member of the Homeland Defence Experts of 1941 (1941 års hemortsförsvarssakkunniga). Bengtsson was promoted to colonel in 1944 and was appointed commander of Gothenburg Anti-Aircraft Corps in 1943. He became commander of Karlsborg Anti-Aircraft Regiment in Karlsborg in 1946 and was the local commander in Karlsborg from 1946 to 1953. Bengtsson then served as Inspector of the Inspector of the Air Defence from 1953 from 1957, during which time he was a member of the (Luftförsvarsutredningen) from 1953 to 1954. He was employed at the Swedish National Defence Research Institute in 1958.

Personal life
In 1932, Bengtsson married Karin (Kai) Fresk (born 1904) the daughter of senior engineer Albert Fresk and Gurli (née Söderström).

Dates of rank
1918 – Second Lieutenant
1930 – Lieutenant
1932 – Captain
1939 – Major
1941 – Lieutenant colonel
1944 – Colonel

Honours
Member of the Royal Swedish Academy of War Sciences (1944)

Bibliography

References

1897 births
1977 deaths
Swedish Army colonels
Swedish male artistic gymnasts
Gymnasts at the 1920 Summer Olympics
Olympic gymnasts of Sweden
Olympic gold medalists for Sweden
Olympic medalists in gymnastics
Medalists at the 1920 Summer Olympics
People from Ängelholm Municipality
Members of the Royal Swedish Academy of War Sciences
Sportspeople from Skåne County